Litsea gardneri is a species of plant in the family Lauraceae. It is endemic to Sri Lanka. It is known as "talan - තලන්" in Sinhala.

References

gardneri
Endemic flora of Sri Lanka
Threatened flora of Asia
Vulnerable plants
Taxonomy articles created by Polbot